Vitali Culibaba (born 26 January 1971) is a retired Moldovan football defender and manager.

References

External links
Vitali Culibaba at Footballdatabase

1971 births
Living people
Moldovan footballers
CS Tiligul-Tiras Tiraspol players
FC Zimbru Chișinău players
FC Agro-Goliador Chișinău players
FC Politehnica Chișinău players
Association football defenders
Moldova international footballers
Moldovan football managers
Moldovan expatriate football managers
Expatriate football managers in Armenia
Moldovan expatriate sportspeople in Armenia